Distant Teardrop is a 2019 Indian drama film written and directed by Padmakumar Narasimhamurthy and produced by Satish Kaushik under the banner of The Satish Kaushik Entertainment.he film stars Sri Lankan actor Ravindra Randeniya. At the heart of the story is the Tamil-Sinhala conflict. It could be a metaphor for the Israel-Palestine conflict, the Hindu-Muslim conflict in India, the Black and White conflict in America, another father and son tale, is preparing its Indian release. The film premiered in late 2019.

References

External links
 

2019 films
2010s Hindi-language films
2019 drama films
Indian drama films
2010s English-language films